Bokhacheon is a river of South Korea. It is a river of the Han River system.

References

Rivers of South Korea